His Exciting Night is a 1938 American comedy film directed by Gus Meins and written by Pat C. Flick, Edward Eliscu and Morton Grant. It is based on the 1934 play Adam's Evening by Katharine Kavanaugh. The film stars Charlie Ruggles, Richard Lane, Maxie Rosenbloom, Marion Martin, Stepin Fetchit and Ona Munson. The film was released on November 11, 1938, by Universal Pictures.

Plot
On his wedding-eve night Adam Tripp becomes the victim of several practical jokes and almost loses his future bride.

Cast        
Charlie Ruggles as Adam Tripp 
Richard Lane as Homer Carslake
Maxie Rosenbloom as 'Doc' McCoy 
Marion Martin as Gypsy McCoy
Stepin Fetchit as Casper
Ona Munson as Anne Baker
Raymond Parker as Bob
Frances Robinson as Margie Baker
Georgia Caine as Aunt Elizabeth Baker
Regis Toomey as Bill Stewart
Mark Daniels as McGill 
Benny Baker as Taxi Driver

References

External links
 

1938 films
American comedy films
1938 comedy films
Universal Pictures films
Films directed by Gus Meins
American black-and-white films
1930s English-language films
1930s American films